Salim Haim (1919–1983) was a dermatologist. In 1965 he described for the first time a case of Haim-Munk syndrome.

See also
 Haim-Munk syndrome

References

Iraqi dermatologists
1919 births
1983 deaths
20th-century Iraqi physicians
Iraqi emigrants to Mandatory Palestine